"Slide" is a song by American rapper French Montana featuring American rappers Blueface and Lil Tjay. It was released on April 16, 2019, through Epic Records. The music video was also released 2 days later  The song debuted at number 90 on the US Billboard Hot 100 and at number 89 in the UK. A remix featuring American rapper Wiz Khalifa was released on June 7, 2019, with Blueface and Lil Tjay still in the song.

Background
The song features a sample of Snoop Dogg's 1993 song "Serial Killa".

Critical reception
Paper described the song as a "dynamic, hook-heavy jam that has the potential to set off a viral summer dance trend".

Music video
The video was co-directed by French Montana and Spiff TV and released on April 18, 2019. It features French Montana, Blueface and Lil Tjay dressed in colorful suits and wearing skull masks. Paper called the video "equal parts Dia de los Muertos, mobsters, and Dick Tracy". Rolling Stone said it "mixes the macabre and the stylish".

Charts

Certifications

References

2019 singles
2019 songs
French Montana songs
Blueface songs
Lil Tjay songs
Songs written by French Montana
Songs written by Snoop Dogg
Songs written by Dr. Dre
Songs written by Lil Tjay
Songs written by Kurupt
Songs written by Daz Dillinger